Heart of Stone (Cuore di Pietra) is a 1996 novel written by the Italian writer Sebastiano Vassalli and published by house Einaudi. It is the story of a stately house owned by lord Basilio Pignatelli, traced from the birth of the Italian Reign to today. Vassalli shows Italy's economic changes, in which Italians are the key players.

Plot 
The novel is set in Novara, a small town surrounded by snowy mountains, where many wars occurred, for example the one against Crucchi. This story shows us the difficult period of the economic progress by describing the huge house and its owner's life. The main character of the novel is the majestic building, which was done up by the well-known architect Antonelli. The owner was lord Pignatelli, a Neapolitan gentleman, who came to Novara to join the royal army. The property was passed on to the heirs, until the family couldn't afford the house anymore, so the family was made to rent out some of the house's rooms. Day by day the residence became battered and its owners left it. Today the building offers refuge to vagabonds.

Characters 
 Antonelli, the architect, who is ambiguous and ill-tempered. He doesn't care about the tastes of his clients and only wants to concentrate on his work. In fact, he is ambitious.
 Count Pignatelli, who left Naples because of a problem with some women and came to Novara to be the official of the king. In this town he'll buy a house for his family and servants. He will die under mysterious circumstances in his office. The lord has also three children:
 Raffaele, the first born, who has a beautiful wife Assunta and two children (Giacomo and Maria Gabriella)
 Alfonso, the second born, solicitor, with his wife Lucia, who is pregnant.
 Orsola, young and unhappy, who will commit suicide for a married man.

References 

1996 novels
20th-century Italian novels